Otto Kelmer (born 28 January 1948) is a German film director, author, artist, and psychoanalyst.

Life and work
Otto Kelmer was born in Bucharest in 1948 and emigrated with his parents to Germany in 1963. From 1966 to 1967 he studied script writing and directing at the Filmacademy Vienna. In the autumn of 1967, he took up his studies at Ruhr University Bochum, majoring in psychology, specializing in media sciences, and finally earning his doctorate in 1975 with the publication Television – Grandmaster of Violence?: The Unmasking of a Myth.

The German weekly newspaper Die Zeit offered Kelmer the opportunity to reach a wider audience through a full-page article in its cultural review. During this period Kelmer shot a number of shorts, including CAGE, which was shown at the International Short Film Festival Oberhausen in 1969.

In September 1979, German literary critic Marcel Reich-Ranicki published a selection of Kelmer's aphorisms in the Frankfurter Allgemeine Zeitung.

From 1979 to 1985, Kelmer was introduced to classical drawing and painting by two Romanian artists based in Germany and France, Serban Gabrea and Daniel Négo. In 1980, Kelmer’s drawing Uncontrolled multiplication of René Magritte was shown by the curators Maurice Rapin and Mirabelle Dors at the Salon Figuration Critique/Centre Culturel de la Rue du Louvre in Paris.
After taking part in numerous group exhibitions at venues like Schloß Ringenberg Wesel in 1983 and Lehmbruck Museum in Duisburg in 1984, Kelmer was invited to exhibit his installation Tantalus' Dining Room at the avantgarde Galerie Löhrl in Mönchengladbach.

As well as pursuing his artistic activities, Kelmer completed his training as a psychoanalyst from 1982 to 1991 with professors Tobias Brocher and Edeltrud Meistermann-Seeger, both known for their unorthodox role in further developing the theory and practice of psychoanalysis.

Kelmer advanced his film studies under the mentorship of directors like Krzysztof Zanussi and Krzysztof Kieślowski as well as screenwriter Frank Daniel. Between 1991 and 1992, Kelmer wrote and directed the partly authentic, partly fictional The Secret Collection of Salvador Dalí for the German television channel ZDF. The film received numerous national and international accolades including the Grimme Award, the audience Award of the Marler Group for the best TV production of 1992, and the Prix du Jury at the International Festival of Films on Art FIFA in Montréal in 1994.

For the Dalí film, Kelmer created, among other art works, the sculpture Narcissistic Triptych or Mirroring Apollo, which has since been exhibited in the Film Museum Düsseldorf. The film was shown twice in the Centre Pompidou in Paris: in 1994 at the 4e Biennale Internationale du Film sur l´Art and in 2013 as part of the Salvador Dalí retrospective, curated by Jean-Hubert Martin.
 
As part of the exhibition Charade – Rochade at the Haubrok Collection Berlin in 2012, Kelmer's trailer for a not-yet-existing film was one of the most excitedly received and discussed exhibits.

Distinctions
 1993: The Golden Adolf-Grimme-Award for The Secret Collection of Salvador Dalí
 1993: The Audience Award of the Marler Group for the best TV production of 1992 for The Secret Collection of Salvador Dalí
 1994: Jury Prize at the Festival International du Film sur l'Art FIFA Montréal for La collection secrète de Salvador Dalí

Bibliography
Books

References

External links
 [https://taz.de/!1628779/ 29. Adolf Grimme Preis 1993. taz] . Retrieved 3 September 2019.
 Die geheime Sammlung des Salvador Dalí. . Retrieved 29 January 2018.
 ARD TV. Die geheime Sammlung des Salvador Dali. . Retrieved 3 September 2019.
 ARTE TV . Retrieved 3 September 2019.
Charade – Rochade: 08.09.2012–09.10.2012 Haubrokshows. Publisher description for Library of Congress.'' Retrieved 4 February 2018.

1948 births
German film directors
German contemporary artists
German male writers
German psychoanalysts
Living people